José Antonio Martiarena (born 14 January 1968) is a Spanish former track cyclist. He competed in two events at the 1988 Summer Olympics.

References

1968 births
Living people
Spanish male cyclists
Olympic cyclists of Spain
Cyclists at the 1988 Summer Olympics
Sportspeople from San Sebastián
Cyclists from the Basque Country (autonomous community)